Ranuccio Farnese, Duke of Parma may refer to:

Ranuccio I Farnese, Duke of Parma (1569 - 1622)
Ranuccio II Farnese, Duke of Parma (1630 – 1694) grandson of the above.